United Nations Security Council resolution 879, adopted unanimously on 29 October 1993, after reaffirming resolutions 782 (1992), 797 (1992), 818 (1993), 850 (1993) and 863 (1993) on the situation in Mozambique, the Council reiterated the importance of the Rome General Peace Accords and extended the mandate of the United Nations Operation in Mozambique for an interim period ending 5 November 1993.

See also
 History of Mozambique
 List of United Nations Security Council Resolutions 801 to 900 (1993–1994)
 Mozambican Civil War

References

External links
 
Text of the Resolution at undocs.org

 0879
1993 in Mozambique
Mozambican Civil War
 0879
October 1993 events